The Baltimore Gas and Electric Company Building is a historic office building located at Baltimore, Maryland, United States. It is the former headquarters of the old Consolidated Gas, Light and Electric Power Company of Baltimore City, which was a merger at the turn of the 20th century of the former century old Gas Light Company of Baltimore with several other formerly competing gas and electric power companies which had risen in the late 19th century, to form a single metropolitan wide unified utility system. In 1955, the old cumbersome Consolidated title was jettisoned and the utility rebranded as the Baltimore Gas and Electric Company (BG&E).

History and Construction 
A 21-story skyscraper designed by the Boston and Baltimore-based architectural firm of Parker, Thomas and Rice, and was constructed in 1916. Standing at  it was tied with the Emerson Bromo-Seltzer Tower from 1916 to 1923 as the tallest building in Baltimore. It was constructed with a structural steel skeleton and tile arch flooring structure. The exterior is clad with gray granite and gray and white marble from the first through third floors (including the mezzanine) and glazed terra cotta in a Beaux-Arts Classical Style.  The building includes sculptures at the fourth floor representing "knowledge", "light", "heat" and "power."

Baltimore Gas and Electric Company Building was listed on the National Register of Historic Places in 2003.

A smaller addition was built in 1966, designed by Fisher, Nes, Campbell & Associates.

It was purchased in 2006 and reopened in 2007 as luxury apartments complete with two penthouse levels by Southern Management Companies.

References

External links

, including photo from 2003, at Maryland Historical Trust

Downtown Baltimore
Residential skyscrapers in Baltimore
Commercial buildings on the National Register of Historic Places in Baltimore
Office buildings completed in 1916
Beaux-Arts architecture in Maryland
Exelon